The Manassas City Police Department (MCPD) is the primary law enforcement agency servicing 43,099 people living in the City of Manassas, Virginia. In 2020, the department employed 141 staff, 98 of which were sworn full-time police officers.

Organization
The chief of police is Douglas W. Keen. The MCPD is a nationally accredited law enforcement agency  through the Commission on Accreditation for Law Enforcement Agencies (CALEA).

Administrative Services
Captain Brian K. Larkin, Division Commander

The Administrative Services division consists sworn personnel and support staff.
Functions of the Police Department that fall under this section are:
 Budget Process/Grant Management
 Emergency Communications
 Information Technology
 Property/Evidentiary
 Records
 Recruitment/Hiring
 Training

Patrol Services Division
Captain Tina P. Laguna, Division Commander

The Patrol Services Division consists of a team of sworn police officers and support personnel whose function is to provide round-the-clock police services to the City of Manassas and provide the first line of protection in the homeland security efforts.
Functions and specialties within the division include:
 Auxiliary Police Section
 Bicycle Unit
 Canine Unit (Narcotics and Explosives)
 Civil Defense Unit (CDU)
 Crisis Negotiation Team
 ESU (SWAT) Team
 Honor Guard
 Motor Squad
 Motor Carrier Safety Unit
 Parking Enforcement
 SCUBA Team
 School Crossing Guards
 Special Problems Unit (SPU)

Investigative Services Division
Captain Vic Hatcher, Division Commander

The Investigative Services Division consists of a team of detectives, officers and support personnel whose function is to investigate incidents and criminal reports to lead to the identification and apprehension of criminal offenders.
Functions and specialties within the division include:
 Crimes against persons
 Gang Task Force
 Property crimes
 Vice/narcotics
 Internet Crimes Against Children Task Force
 Crime prevention
 Neighborhood Watch
 Public information officer
 School resource officers

Animal Control Services Division
Sergeant Cari Mello, Chief Animal Control Officer

 Operates/manages the animal shelter and adoption services for unwanted, stray, and homeless animals
 Achieves compliance of animal care and control ordinances
 Assists citizens with proper tools and information for pet owners
 Respond to investigate reports of animal abuse, neglect, nuisance animals, dangerous animals, & bites from domestic animals and wildlife
 Maintains a lost and found data file
 Issues dog licenses
 Respond accordingly to wildlife complaints

Fallen officers
Since the establishment of the Manassas Police Department, 1 officer has died in the line of duty.

See also

 List of law enforcement agencies in Virginia

References

External links
Manassas City Police Department - official website
City of Manassas - official website
Virginia Police Canine Association - official website
Manassas City Police Association's 9th Annual Memorial Run

Municipal police departments of Virginia
Police Department